David Dale Reimer is an American diplomat and member of the Senior Foreign Service. He has served as the United States ambassador to Sierra Leone since 2021. He previously served concurrently as the United States ambassador to Mauritius and United States ambassador to Seychelles from 2018 to 2021.

Education 

Reimer is a native of Smithville, Ohio. He earned his Bachelor of Arts degree in history from Goshen College and his Master of Public and International Affairs from the University of Pittsburgh.

Career 

Reimer has served as a diplomat since 1991. In 2015, he became the director of the Office of West African Affairs in the Bureau of African Affairs at the United States Department of State. Reimer is a former deputy chief of mission and office director.

Ambassador to Mauritius and Seychelles 

On November 2, 2017, President Donald Trump announced his intent to nominate Reimer to be the United States ambassador to Mauritius and United States ambassador to Seychelles. On November 2, 2017, his nomination was confirmed by voice vote in the U.S Senate. He was sworn in as Ambassador on December 13, 2017. He left his post on January 15, 2021.

Ambassador to Sierra Leone 

On June 10, 2020, President Donald Trump announced his intent to nominate Reimer to be the next United States ambassador to Sierra Leone. On June 22, 2020, his nomination was sent to the United States Senate. He appeared before the Senate Foreign Relations Committee on December 2 and was confirmed by voice vote of the full Senate in the early morning hours of December 22, 2020. He presented his credentials to President Julius Maada Bio on March 24, 2021.

Personal life
Reimer speaks French, Italian, and German.

References

Living people
Goshen College alumni
University of Pittsburgh alumni
Trump administration personnel
Ambassadors of the United States to Mauritius
Ambassadors of the United States to Seychelles
United States Foreign Service personnel
People from Smithville, Ohio
Year of birth missing (living people)
21st-century American diplomats